Gianluca Masi (born 22 January 1972) is an Italian astrophysicist and astronomer, as well as a discoverer of minor planets and variable stars.

Scientific career 

He started his interest in astronomy at childhood, later becoming a professional astronomer, earning a PhD in astronomy at the Sapienza University of Rome in 2006. At the same time, he devoted a lot of efforts to science communication, on the international stage.

Vincent van Gogh painting 

His professional interests include asteroids and comets, variable stars and extrasolar planets, with many contributions in all those fields. He was able to determine the date that Vincent van Gogh painted Starry Night Over the Rhone by studying the star placement.

Virtual Telescope project 

In 2006 he started the Virtual Telescope project (part of Bellatrix Astronomical Observatory), consisting of several robotic telescopes, remotely available in real-time over the Internet. Through this system, real time online observations are performed; sharing the universe with the world. More than 1,000,000 individuals each year observe the sky through the Virtual Telescope.

Awards and honors 

He received a number of prizes, including the Ruggieri Prize (2003), the Gene Shoemaker NEO Grant (2005) and the Tacchini Prize (2006) as well as other acknowledgements for his scientific activities. The Nysian asteroid 21795 Masi, discovered by his college Franco Mallia in 1999, was named in his honor.

List of discovered minor planets

See also 
 Supernova ASASSN-15lh

References

External links
 Biography
 The Virtual Telescope Project website

1972 births

Discoverers of asteroids
21st-century Italian astronomers
Living people
20th-century Italian astronomers